Louise Adélaïde de Bourbon (5 October 1757 – 10 March 1824) was a French nun. She was the last Remiremont abbess and founded at the beginning of the Bourbon Restoration a religious community that became famous among French Catholics under the name of Bénédictines de la rue Monsieur. She constructed the Hôtel de Mademoiselle de Condé, named after her.

Early life
Born at the Château de Chantilly in 1757, Louise Adélaïde was the third and last child of Louis Joseph de Bourbon, prince de Condé and his wife, Charlotte de Rohan (1737–1760), the daughter of Charles de Rohan, prince de Soubise. As a member of the reigning House of Bourbon, she was born a princesse du sang; this entitled her to the style of Her Serene Highness. She was educated at the Pentemont Abbey, one of Paris' most prestigious schools for daughters of the aristocracy.

At court, she was known as Mademoiselle de Condé and in some sources is styled as princesse de Condé. A descendant of le Grand Condé, Louise Adelaïde was the aunt of the last duc d'Enghien. She was also a second cousin of the future revolutionary, Philippe Égalité. A first cousin was the Charles Alain, Prince of Guéméné, son of her aunt Victoire de Rohan, princesse de Guéméné.

Her mother died at the Hôtel de Condé after a long illness as reported by the Duke of Luynes; at the time, Louise Adélaïde was just three years of age. As a result, Louise Adélaïde was raised by her great-aunt, Henriette Louise de Bourbon (1703–1772), the Benedictine abbess of the Beaumont Abbey (now in Tours).

Abbess of Beaumont-lès-Tours
Louise Adélaïde was supposed to marry her distant cousin Charles Philippe, comte d'Artois, but the marriage fell through; Charles later married Princess Maria Theresa of Savoy and eventually became King Charles X of France during the Bourbon Restoration.

Due to her convent education, almost all of Louise Adélaïde's youth was spent in a religious setting. Her education was completed at the royal abbey of Bernardine Panthémont, located in the 7th arrondissement of Paris. In 1780, Mademoiselle de Condé requested permission to leave the convent of Panthémont. It was at this time that she built the Hôtel de Bourbon-Condé for her personal use, her father still retaining the grand Palais Bourbon built by his grandmother, Louise-Françoise de Bourbon, as his principal residence in Paris. Considerations of rank prevented her from marriage. In 1786, she was appointed Abbess of Remiremont. She did not, however, visit Remiremont more than three times during her period in office

Last years and death
In 1789, she fled to Belgium to escape the first stages of the French Revolution. In 1802, in Poland, she took the veil, returning to Paris in 1816 to found a religious institution. She was later the Lady of Saint Pierre and Metz and Cetera, lordships she held in her own right. Her father died in 1818. Louise Adélaïde died quietly in Paris six years later, in 1824. Six months after her death, her former suitor, the comte d'Artois, succeeded to the French throne as King Charles X.

She was buried at the Abbaye Saint-Louis de Limon, Vauhallan.

Ancestry

References and notes

1757 births
1824 deaths
People from Chantilly, Oise
Benedictine nuns
House of Bourbon-Condé
French Roman Catholic abbesses
19th-century French nuns
Abbesses of Remiremont